Lehtineniana is a genus of South Pacific cribellate orb-weavers first described by Danniella Sherwood in 2022.

Species
 it contains five species:
Lehtineniana beattyi (Opell, 1983) — Caroline Is.
Lehtineniana dissimilis (Berland, 1924) — Vanuatu, New Caledonia
Lehtineniana pukapukan (Salvatierra, Brescovit & Tourinho, 2015) — Cook Is.
Lehtineniana tahitiensis (Berland, 1934) — French Polynesia (Marquesas Is., Society Is., Austral Is.)
Lehtineniana vaka (Salvatierra, Brescovit & Tourinho, 2015) — Cook Is.

References

Araneomorphae genera
Uloboridae